Francis G. "Bo" Wininger (November 16, 1922 – December 7, 1967) was an American professional golfer who played on the PGA Tour in the 1950s and 1960s.

Wininger played on the same high school football and baseball teams in Commerce, Oklahoma as future Yankee great Mickey Mantle, albeit a few years before Mantle came along. He attended Oklahoma State University.

Wininger served in the United States Naval Air Corps during World War II. He turned pro in 1952 and joined the PGA Tour in 1953. After winning three times in the mid-1950s, he quit playing the tour full-time in 1959 to take a job in public relations. He returned to his winning ways in the early 1960s, winning the Greater New Orleans Open Invitational in 1962 and 1963 and the Carling Open Invitational in 1962.

Wininger had several runner-up finishes on the PGA Tour in addition to his six wins; these include a 2nd or T-2 finish at the 1957 and 1959 Canadian Open, the 1959 and 1960 Dallas Open Invitational, and the 1959 San Diego Open Invitational. He was the first back-to-back winner in the modern history of the New Orleans tournament. His best finish in a major was 4th place at the 1965 PGA Championship.

He died in Oklahoma City, Oklahoma at the age of 45 after suffering a stroke that left him paralyzed on his right side.

Professional wins (7)

PGA Tour wins (6)

PGA Tour playoff record (1–1)

Other wins (1)
1953 Pennsylvania Open Championship

See also

List of golfers with most PGA Tour wins

Esoterica
Wininger appeared as himself in an episode of The Lucy Show titled "Lucy Takes Up Golf."  Fellow golf pro Jimmy Demaret also appeared in the same episode.  It first aired on January 27, 1964.

References

American male golfers
Oklahoma State Cowboys golfers
PGA Tour golfers
Golfers from California
Golfers from Oklahoma
United States Navy personnel of World War II
Sportspeople from Chico, California
People from Commerce, Oklahoma
1922 births
1967 deaths